A nutrient is a substance used by an organism to survive, grow, and reproduce. The requirement for dietary nutrient intake applies to animals, plants, fungi, and protists. Nutrients can be incorporated into cells for metabolic purposes or excreted by cells to create non-cellular structures, such as hair, scales, feathers, or exoskeletons. Some nutrients can be metabolically converted to smaller molecules in the process of releasing energy, such as for carbohydrates, lipids, proteins, and fermentation products (ethanol or vinegar), leading to end-products of water and carbon dioxide. All organisms require water. Essential nutrients for animals are the energy sources, some of the amino acids that are combined to create proteins, a subset of fatty acids, vitamins and certain minerals. Plants require more diverse minerals absorbed through roots, plus carbon dioxide and oxygen absorbed through leaves. Fungi live on dead or living organic matter and meet nutrient needs from their host.

Different types of organisms have different essential nutrients. Ascorbic acid (vitamin C) is essential, meaning it must be consumed in sufficient amounts, to humans and some other animal species, but some animals and plants are able to synthesize it. Nutrients may be organic or inorganic: organic compounds include most compounds containing carbon, while all other chemicals are inorganic. Inorganic nutrients include nutrients such as iron, selenium, and zinc, while organic nutrients include, among many others, energy-providing compounds and vitamins.

A classification used primarily to describe nutrient needs of animals divides nutrients into macronutrients and micronutrients. Consumed in relatively large amounts (grams or ounces), macronutrients (carbohydrates, fats, proteins, water) are primarily used to generate energy or to incorporate into tissues for growth and repair. Micronutrients are needed in smaller amounts (milligrams or micrograms); they have subtle biochemical and physiological roles in cellular processes, like vascular functions or nerve conduction. Inadequate amounts of essential nutrients, or diseases that interfere with absorption, result in a deficiency state that compromises growth, survival and reproduction. Consumer advisories for dietary nutrient intakes, such as the United States Dietary Reference Intake, are based on deficiency outcomes and provide macronutrient and micronutrient guides for both lower and upper limits of intake. In many countries, macronutrients and micronutrients in significant content are required by regulations to be displayed on food product labels. Nutrients in larger quantities than the body needs may have harmful effects. Edible plants also contain thousands of compounds generally called phytochemicals which have unknown effects on disease or health, including a diverse class with non-nutrient status called polyphenols, which remain poorly understood as of 2017.

Types

Macronutrients 
Macronutrients are defined in several ways.
 The chemical elements humans consume in the largest quantities are carbon, hydrogen, nitrogen, oxygen, phosphorus, and sulphur, summarized as CHNOPS.
 The chemical compounds that humans consume in the largest quantities and provide bulk energy are classified as carbohydrates, proteins, and fats. Water must be also consumed in large quantities but does not provide caloric value.
 Calcium, sodium, potassium, magnesium, and chloride ions, along with phosphorus and sulfur, are listed with macronutrients because they are required in large quantities compared to micronutrients, i.e., vitamins and other minerals, the latter often described as trace or ultratrace minerals.

Macronutrients provide energy:
 Carbohydrates are compounds made up of types of sugar. Carbohydrates are classified according to their number of sugar units: monosaccharides (such as glucose and fructose), disaccharides (such as sucrose and lactose), oligosaccharides, and polysaccharides (such as starch, glycogen, and cellulose).
 Proteins are organic compounds that consist of amino acids joined by peptide bonds. Since the body cannot manufacture some of the amino acids (termed essential amino acids), the diet must supply them. Through digestion, proteins are broken down by proteases back into free amino acids.
 Fats consist of a glycerin molecule with three fatty acids attached. Fatty acid molecules contain a -COOH group attached to unbranched hydrocarbon chains connected by single bonds alone (saturated fatty acids) or by both double and single bonds (unsaturated fatty acids). Fats are needed for construction and maintenance of cell membranes, to maintain a stable body temperature, and to sustain the health of skin and hair. Because the body does not manufacture certain fatty acids (termed essential fatty acids), they must be obtained through one's diet.

Micronutrients 
Micronutrients support metabolism.
 Dietary minerals are generally trace elements, salts, or ions such as copper and iron that are essential to human metabolism.
 Vitamins are organic compounds essential to the body. They usually act as coenzymes or cofactors for various proteins in the body.

Essentiality

Essential nutrients 

An essential nutrient is a nutrient required for normal physiological function that cannot be synthesized in the body – either at all or in sufficient quantities – and thus must be obtained from a dietary source. Apart from water, which is universally required for the maintenance of homeostasis in mammals, essential nutrients are indispensable for various cellular metabolic processes and for the maintenance and function of tissues and organs. The nutrients considered essential for humans comprise nine amino acids, two fatty acids, thirteen vitamins, fifteen minerals and choline. In addition, there are several molecules that are considered conditionally essential nutrients since they are indispensable in certain developmental and pathological states.

Amino acids

An essential amino acid is an amino acid that is required by an organism but cannot be synthesized de novo by it, and therefore must be supplied in its diet. Out of the twenty standard protein-producing amino acids, nine cannot be endogenously synthesized by humans: phenylalanine, valine, threonine, tryptophan, methionine, leucine, isoleucine, lysine, and histidine.

Fatty acids

Essential fatty acids (EFAs) are fatty acids that humans and other animals must ingest because the body requires them for good health but cannot synthesize them. Only two fatty acids are known to be essential for humans: alpha-linolenic acid (an omega-3 fatty acid) and linoleic acid (an omega-6 fatty acid).

Vitamins

Vitamins are organic molecules essential for an organism that are not classified as amino acids or fatty acids. They commonly function as enzymatic cofactors, metabolic regulators or antioxidants. Humans require thirteen vitamins in their diet, most of which are actually groups of related molecules (e.g. vitamin E includes tocopherols and tocotrienols): vitamins A, C, D, E, K, thiamine (B1), riboflavin (B2), niacin (B3), pantothenic acid (B5), pyridoxine (B6), biotin (B7), folate (B9), and cobalamin (B12). The requirement for vitamin D is conditional, as people who get sufficient exposure to ultraviolet light, either from the sun or an artificial source, synthesize vitamin D in the skin.

Minerals

Minerals are the exogenous chemical elements indispensable for life. Although the four elements: carbon, hydrogen, oxygen, and nitrogen, are essential for life, they are so plentiful in food and drink that these are not considered nutrients and there are no recommended intakes for these as minerals. The need for nitrogen is addressed by requirements set for protein, which is composed of nitrogen-containing amino acids. Sulfur is essential, but again does not have a recommended intake. Instead, recommended intakes are identified for the sulfur-containing amino acids methionine and cysteine.

The essential nutrient elements for humans, listed in order of Recommended Dietary Allowance (expressed as a mass), are potassium, chloride, sodium, calcium, phosphorus, magnesium, iron, zinc, manganese, copper, iodine, chromium, molybdenum, selenium. Additionally, cobalt is a component of Vitamin B12 which is essential. There are other minerals which are essential for some plants and animals, but may or may not be essential for humans, such as boron and silicon.

Choline

Choline is an essential nutrient. The cholines are a family of water-soluble quaternary ammonium compounds. Choline is the parent compound of the cholines class, consisting of ethanolamine having three methyl substituents attached to the amino function. Healthy humans fed artificially composed diets that are deficient in choline develop fatty liver, liver damage, and muscle damage. Choline was not initially classified as essential because the human body can produce choline in small amounts through phosphatidylcholine metabolism.

Conditionally essential 
Conditionally essential nutrients are certain organic molecules that can normally be synthesized by an organism, but under certain conditions in insufficient quantities. In humans, such conditions include premature birth, limited nutrient intake, rapid growth, and certain disease states. Inositol, taurine, arginine, glutamine and nucleotides are classified as conditionally essential and are particularly important in neonatal diet and metabolism.

Non-essential 
Non-essential nutrients are substances within foods that can have a significant impact on health. Insoluble dietary fiber is not absorbed in the human digestive tract, but is important in maintaining the bulk of a bowel movement to avoid constipation. Soluble fiber can be metabolized by bacteria residing in the large intestine. Soluble fiber is marketed as serving a prebiotic function with claims for promoting "healthy" intestinal bacteria. Bacterial metabolism of soluble fiber also produces short-chain fatty acids like butyric acid, which may be absorbed into intestinal cells as a source of food energy.

Non-nutrients
A  serving of wine contains . A  serving of beer contains . According to the U.S. Department of Agriculture, based on NHANES 2013–2014 surveys, women ages 20 and up consume on average 6.8grams of alcohol per day and men consume on average 15.5 grams per day. Alcoholic beverages are considered empty calorie foods because, while providing energy, they contribute no essential nutrients.

By definition, phytochemicals include all nutritional and non-nutritional components of edible plants. Included as nutritional constituents are provitamin A carotenoids, whereas those without nutrient status are diverse polyphenols, flavonoids, resveratrol, and lignans – often claimed to have antioxidant effects – that are present in numerous plant foods. A number of phytochemical compounds are under preliminary research for their potential effects on human diseases and health. However, the qualification for nutrient status of compounds with poorly defined properties in vivo is that they must first be defined with a Dietary Reference Intake level to enable accurate food labeling, a condition not established for most phytochemicals that are claimed to be antioxidant nutrients.

Deficiencies and toxicity
See Vitamin, Mineral (nutrient), Protein (nutrient)

An inadequate amount of a nutrient is a deficiency. Deficiencies can be due to a number of causes including an inadequacy in nutrient intake, called a dietary deficiency, or any of several conditions that interfere with the utilization of a nutrient within an organism. Some of the conditions that can interfere with nutrient utilization include problems with nutrient absorption, substances that cause a greater than normal need for a nutrient, conditions that cause nutrient destruction, and conditions that cause greater nutrient excretion. Nutrient toxicity occurs when excess consumption of a nutrient does harm to an organism.

In the United States and Canada, recommended dietary intake levels of essential nutrients are based on the minimum level that "will maintain a defined level of nutriture in an individual", a definition somewhat different from that used by the World Health Organization and Food and Agriculture Organization of a "basal requirement to indicate the level of intake needed to prevent pathologically relevant and clinically detectable signs of a dietary inadequacy".

In setting human nutrient guidelines, government organizations do not necessarily agree on amounts needed to avoid deficiency or maximum amounts to avoid the risk of toxicity. For example, for vitamin C, recommended intakes range from 40 mg/day in India to 155 mg/day for the European Union. The table below shows U.S. Estimated Average Requirements (EARs) and Recommended Dietary Allowances (RDAs) for vitamins and minerals, PRIs for the European Union (same concept as RDAs), followed by what three government organizations deem to be the safe upper intake. RDAs are set higher than EARs to cover people with higher than average needs. Adequate Intakes (AIs) are set when there is not sufficient information to establish EARs and RDAs. Countries establish tolerable upper intake levels, also referred to as upper limits (ULs), based on amounts that cause adverse effects. Governments are slow to revise information of this nature. For the U.S. values, with the exception of calcium and vitamin D, all of the data date from 1997 to 2004.

* The daily recommended amounts of niacin and magnesium are higher than the tolerable upper limit because, for both nutrients, the ULs identify the amounts which will not increase risk of adverse effects when the nutrients are consumed as a serving of a dietary supplement. Magnesium supplementation above the UL may cause diarrhea. Supplementation with niacin above the UL may cause flushing of the face and a sensation of body warmth. Each country or regional regulatory agency decides on a safety margin below when symptoms may occur, so the ULs may differ based on source.

EAR U.S. Estimated Average Requirements.

RDA U.S. Recommended Dietary Allowances; higher for adults than for children, and may be even higher for women who are pregnant or lactating.

AI  U.S. Adequate Intake; AIs established when there is not sufficient information to set EARs and RDAs.

PRI Population Reference Intake is European Union equivalent of RDA; higher for adults than for children, and may be even higher for women who are pregnant or lactating. For Thiamin and Niacin, the PRIs are expressed as amounts per megajoule (239 kilocalories) of food energy consumed.

Upper Limit  Tolerable upper intake levels.

ND  ULs have not been determined.

NE  EARs, PRIs or AIs have not yet been established or will not be (EU does not consider chromium an essential nutrient).

Plant

Plant nutrients consist of more than a dozen minerals absorbed through roots, plus carbon dioxide and oxygen absorbed or released through leaves. All organisms obtain all their nutrients from the surrounding environment.

Plants absorb carbon, hydrogen and oxygen from air and soil in the form of carbon dioxide and water. Other nutrients are absorbed from soil (exceptions include some parasitic or carnivorous plants). Counting these, there are 17 important nutrients for plants: these are macronutrients; nitrogen (N), phosphorus (P), potassium (K), calcium (Ca), sulfur (S), magnesium (Mg), carbon (C), oxygen(O) and hydrogen (H), and the micronutrients; iron (Fe), boron (B), chlorine (Cl), manganese (Mn), zinc (Zn), copper (Cu), molybdenum (Mo) and nickel (Ni). In addition to carbon, hydrogen and oxygen; nitrogen, phosphorus, and sulfur are also needed in relatively large quantities. Together, the "Big Six" are the elemental macronutrients for all organisms.
They are sourced from inorganic matter (for example, carbon dioxide, water, nitrates, phosphates, sulfates, and diatomic molecules of nitrogen and, especially, oxygen) and organic matter (carbohydrates, lipids, proteins).

See also

References

External links 

 USDA. Dietary Reference Intakes

Chemical oceanography
Ecology
 
Edaphology
Biology and pharmacology of chemical elements
Nutrition
Essential nutrients